Chien Lee is a Chinese-American entrepreneur, investor, and sports team owner. He has built a multi-club ownership model, owns multiple professional European football clubs and is a well-known investor in European football.

Lee is the founder and Chairman of NewCity Capital, a private investment firm, one of the shareholders of Barnsley F.C., co-owner of FC Thun, co-owner of K.V. Oostende, chairman and co-owner of Nancy, co-owner of Esbjerg fB, co-owner of FC Den Bosch, co-owner of 1. FC Kaiserslautern, former owner and Chairman of OGC Nice and co-founder of 7 Days Inn.

The Financial Times stated that Lee has refined Moneyball and The Wall Street Journal called Lee's football journey "a Moneyball experiment in English soccer".

Career

Lee is the founder, chairman, and CEO of NewCity Capital, a private investment company, focused on the sport and hospitality industries. In August 1989, he founded Lee Holdings Company Inc., a US-based investment company focused on the acquisition of real estate assets. Later in 2005, Lee actively invested in the hospitality Industry, co-founding 7 Days Inn (NYSE: SVN), one of the largest budget hotel chains in China. In 2014, Lee invested in The Grand Ho Tram Strip in Vietnam, one of the region's largest integrated resorts.

In 2016, Lee forayed into professional sports investment and acquired multiple European soccer clubs, building one of the largest portfolios in the world. As of March 2022, Lee has invested in 8 European football clubs. He has created an internal infrastructure and a management team who are able to operate businesses in multiple countries, each with their own unique culture, language, and operational differences. His multi-club ownership is acknowledged as a unique business model in the world's most popular sport.

In a 2018 interview with Forbes, Lee stated that as a long-term investor in football, he would use a data approach to identify talents, focusing on young players on the sporting side, and balancing the budget on the business side. His strategy contrasts sharply with that of many other investors currently in European football, where huge sums of money are invested in marquee players and success is expected overnight. Lee's ambition to build a European football empire continues as his soccer portfolio keeps expanding; the multi-club ownership gives Lee advantages beyond talent recruitment, capitalizing on the global reach of soccer and maximizing lucrative sponsorship revenues, as well as helping the football clubs grow and become more competitive.

Sports/Europe football

Multi-club ownership

Lee's first foray into professional sports was in purchasing French top-tier soccer team OGC Nice FC in June 2016.<ref>[http://www.chinagoabroad.com/en/recent_transaction/chinese-american-investors-acquire-french-football-club-niceChinese, American investors acquire French football club Nice""]</ref> Subsequently, Lee tried to acquire more European soccer teams. In September 2016, Lee held advanced takeover talks with Hull City FC owner Assem Allam."Hull City begin takeover talks with new consortium fronted by Chinese American businessman Chien Lee" After formally ending his takeover bid for Hull City FC in November, Lee made an offer to buy Middlesbrough FC, but was rejected by club owner Steve Gibson in January 2017. In April 2017, Lee was in talks with Brentford FC owner Matthew Benham over a potential bid for the club. Lee was attracted by Brentford FC’s location in London which is close to Heathrow Airport and its stadium development plans."Chien Lee in talks to buy 50 per cent stake in Brentford"- Skysports In December 2017, Lee acquired Barnsley FC from the Cryne family. Later in June 2019, Lee attempted to buy Partick Thistle FC. In November 2019, Lee also invested in FC Thun Football Club.

In January 2020, it was reported that Lee was in the race to buy  KV Oostende Football Club competing with David Blitzer, co-owner of Crystal Palace Football Club and the NBA team Philadelphia 76ers."Nieuwe Amerikaanse koper voor KV Oostende"  After selling French football club OGC Nice to Great Britain's richest man, Jim Ratcliffe back in August 2019, Lee wanted to return to French football. Already the owner of the Barnsley FC in England and FC Thun in Switzerland, Lee looked to expand his portfolio once more. After prospecting several French clubs, Lee set his sights on Toulouse and its football club and entered into exclusive negotiations to buy Toulouse FC in March 2020."What to Expect If Businessman Chien Lee Gets TFC"

In May 2020, Lee completed the acquisition of KV Oostende Football Club, the only professional football club on the Belgian coast and the 4th European soccer investment for him."Chinese investor: We saw KV Ostend as an opportunity" After purchasing KV Oostende Football Club, Lee continued to pursue the French football club Toulouse FC, competing with tech tycoon Michael Dell and his investment fund MSD Capital which were also in the race to buy Toulouse FC."Chien Lee issues Toulouse ultimatum" In July 2020, Lee attempted to acquire SV Mattersburg FC, an Austrian football club from Mattersburg, Burgenland. In December 2020, after an unsuccessful attempt to buy Toulouse FC, Lee turned the attention to AS Nancy Lorraine, competing with City Football Group, the owner of Manchester City F.C. He then purchased AS Nancy Lorraine, thus returning to French football.“ AS Nancy Lorraine statement” In early February 2021, media reported Lee, together with Pacific Media Group, Partners Path Capital, and Krishen Sud were in the process to buy Denmark's Esbjerg fB Football Club and in discussion with Dutch soccer club FC Den Bosch about a possible takeover. In March 2021, Lee completed the acquisition of Esbjerg fB. In April 2021, Bloomberg reported Lee's football group was looking for an opportunity to invest in German football, one of Europe's richest leagues. They approached a number of clubs to see if there was a shared philosophy and an opportunity to invest. In September 2021, Lee completed the acquisition of FC Den Bosch, the first multi-club ownership deal in the Netherlands. In March 2022, Lee, together with Paul Conway, Michael Kalt, Krishen Sud, and Randy Frankel completed their investment in 1. FC Kaiserslautern, one of the most historic clubs in Germany. in April 2022, it was reported that Lee was looking to buy another football club, Lechia Gdańsk in Poland. 
In July 2022, media reported that Lee and Pacific Media Group were in discussions to invest in Hellas Verona F.C., which currently plays in Serie A, the top of the Italian football league.

Moneyball

 
Lee has refined Moneyball and his football journey is a Moneyball experiment in European Soccer according to the Financial Times and The Wall Street Journal,“A Moneyball Experiment in English Soccer’s Second Tier - WSJ” Moneyball, The Art of Winning an Unfair Game is a book by Michael Lewis, published in 2003, about the Oakland Athletics baseball team and its general manager Billy Beane. Its focus is the team's analytical, evidence-based, sabermetric approach to assembling a competitive baseball team despite Oakland's small budget. A film based on Lewis' book, starring Brad Pitt and Jonah Hill, was released in 2011. There are three pillars to Lee's football group version of Moneyball in Soccer, The first is a reliance on analytics over traditional scouting. The second pillar to the group's strategy is a "ruthless commitment to young players", The third and final pillar to Lee's football group Moneyball approach is a narrow focus on the acquisition of players—and coaches—who thrive in a "high-press" system, a forward-thinking, data-driven club with a low-cost, high-pressing formula and Moneyball-like model achieved success at Lee's football group.

During the 2020–21 season, Barnsley FC, with the youngest squad and one of the smallest budgets in the league, took the EFL Championship by storm, finishing in 5th place and making it to the EFL Championship play-offs for the first time in 24 years. However, in the following season Barnsley FC were relegated from the EFL Championship after playing highly unattractive football. KV Oostende in the Belgian First Division finished in 5th place and made it to the playoffs for the Europa League play-off group with one of the youngest squads and the smallest budget in the league. AS Nancy, FC Thun, and Esbjerg fB all chased promotion. According to BBC News Online, Lee credits the use of data as a key contributor to the success, the use of data and technical analysis has become essential for football. Lee predicted that football could use artificial intelligence (AI) to analyse players' thought processes to help them with decision-making and involve technology to communicate with players on the pitch in real time.

Investment style

Lee transformed the way to invest in European football, and his football group focused on investment in distressed clubs and restructuring them on both the business and sporting sides. Many European soccer clubs are struggling to survive and find themselves in alarmingly poor financial positions. Clubs that would never have previously looked for outside investment are now forced to do so because of poor liquidity and massive debt. Lee also focused investment on clubs in lower divisions, taking advantage of the merit-based promotion system and using expertise and good management to get these clubs promoted to higher tiers, thus adding immense value. Lee uses a data approach to identify talents and coaches, focusing on signing young players with development in mind, capturing the huge potential in the player transfer market, buying players at low prices, and reaping huge rewards by selling them high. Using a data approach to identify talents and focusing on young players, playing high-pressing football on the sporting side, and balancing the budget on the business side are part of the policy for all Lee's football clubs. His multi-club ownership approach creates the ecosystem where each club is run with this financial and recruitment model.“Low cost, high pressing: how Barnsley took the Championship by storm”The Wall Street Journal stated that unlike the huge soccer multinationals led by Manchester City and Red Bull, who believe their rivals are Disney and Amazon rather than other soccer teams, Lee's football group focuses on much more modest outfits. The Athletic call Lee's football group a Poundland Red Bull and taking on the elite with data, pressing, and young players. Sheikh Mansour has piped more than £1 billion into City Football Group, including Manchester City F.C. Austrian drinks company Red Bull has poured hundreds of millions into clubs in Austria, Brazil, Germany, and the United States, But Lee's football group have acquired five clubs including Barnsley, Esbjerg, Nancy, Oostende and Thun across Europe at a cost of just over £40 million. 
 
As of March 2022, Lee has invested in 8 European football clubs:

  OGC Nice (sold)
  Barnsley FC
  FC Thun
  K.V. Oostende
  AS Nancy
  Esbjerg fB
  FC Den Bosch
  1. FC Kaiserslautern

OGC Nice

In June 2016, Lee purchased French football team OGC Nice and became the chairman of the board and co-owner at OGC Nice, a French club based in Nice."Barnsley Football Club Statement", "www.barnsleyfc.co.uk" Media reported that Lee acquired the football club for €20 million and is one of the notable sport acquisition in 2016.“Pro sports teams are worth more than ever - see which teams have been sold and how much billionaires are paying for them” During Lee's first year of ownership, the club built a new state-of-the-art academy and training center to focus on the training of young players, appointed Lucien Favre as OGC Nice manager, and signed Italian striker Mario Balotelli from Liverpool F.C. The club qualified for the UEFA Champions League for the first time in its history. In June 2018 Lee appointed former Arsenal midfielder Patrick Vieira as OGC Nice manager.

In February 2019 Lee named his Barnsley CEO Gauthier Ganaye as OGC Nice CEO, the youngest CEO in the history of the French league. In August 2019, according to the Financial Times'' and ESPN, Lee sold OGC Nice to Ineos, run by Great Britain's richest man Jim Ratcliffe, for €100 million, making OGC Nice the most expensive sale ever in French football history at the time of the transaction, costing significantly more than the €79m spent by the Qatar royal family to buy Paris Saint-Germain in 2011, and the €45m paid out by Frank McCourt for the acquisition of Marseille in September 2016. It is also more than what Bordeaux (€95m) and Lille (€80m) were sold for in 2018.

Barnsley F.C.

In December 2017, Lee acquired English football team Barnsley F.C. with business partner Paul Conway after previous failed attempts to purchase Hull City, Middlesbrough, and Brentford, and became the co-chairman and co-owner of Barnsley. Lee was joined by 'Moneyball' pioneer Billy Beane in the acquisition. Since taking over at Barnsley, the club adopted a high pressing style of football, began using a data-oriented approach to identify talents, and focused on signing young players. Barnsley earns more from player trading than it spends, and is one of the more radical squad-building experiments that English soccer has seen.

In Barnsley's first full season under new ownership, Daniel Stendel was appointed as head coach on 6 June 2018, and the club was promoted to the English Championship. Stendel was sacked in October 2019 after a bad run of results, and Lee appointed Gerhard Struber as the new manager on 20 November 2019. Stendel's sacking was widely criticised by fans. In a tough first season back in the Championship, Barnsley finished one place above the relegation zone due to a 91st-minute winning goal in the last fixture by left back Clarke Oduor. On 6 October 2020, an agreement was reached for Struber to join New York Red Bulls on a three-year contract. A reported €2 million ($2.3 million) fee was paid by New York Red Bulls to meet the release clause and purchase Struber's rights. Valerien Ismael was appointed as Struber's replacement as the head coach on 23 October 2020. Barnsley, with the youngest squad and one of the smallest budgets in the league, finished the season in 5th place and made it to the EFL Championship play-offs for the first time in 24 years. Lee said that "This moment belongs to the team, belongs to the fans, and belongs to the city". On 24 June 2021, West Bromwich Albion F.C. agreed to pay £2 million to meet the release clause and buyout Ismael's contract, with the club stating that proceeds from the transfer would be invested back into the club squad. On 29 June 2021 Markus Schopp was named as Barnsley's new coach. On 22 April 2022, after a poor season, Barnsley were relegated to the English League One after an away defeat to Huddersfield Town. Barnsley finished the season bottom of the table, registering only 6 wins and earning 30 points in total. On 15 June 2022, Michael Duff was appointed head coach of Barnsley F.C. on a three-year deal. Duff won the EFL League One Manager of the Month award for November 2022.

FC Thun
In November 2019, Lee became an investor in FC Thun, a Swiss football team from the Bernese Oberland town of Thun. After the investment, the club began using data-based player analysis and player identification to expand its European network for potential player transfers, and marketing the club in Asian markets to extend sponsorship options.

KV Oostende

In May 2020, Lee, together with Pacific Media Group, Partners Path Capital, and Krishen Sud, acquired the Belgian top division team K.V. Oostende, a Belgian football club from the city of Ostend, West Flanders. This was the 4th European soccer club Lee purchased. Lee completed the acquisition of K.V. Oostende during the COVID-19 coronavirus pandemic, and saved the club from liquidation. Lee saw a lot of potential in the club to strengthen the team with a data-based approach to identify talent. Lee believes there are many talented players in Belgium, and the K.V. Oostende youth academy is very important to success. When Lee acquired KV Oostende he named his 31-year-old former CEO at Barnsley and OGC Nice, Gauthier Ganaye, as the new KV Oostende CEO. The club transformed the squad into a young and offensive team and expanded partnerships with existing and new sponsors, started cutting costs, and grew revenue from sponsorship and ticketing sales. KV Oostende, which was heavily loss-making before the acquisition, made a profit of 2.62 million euros in the first year. Lee's football group uses a data approach to identify talents, and focuses on signing young players within the transfer window. The club rebuilt the squad by signing 12 new young players in 30 days, began playing a high-pressing style of football, and appointed German Alexander Blessin, a youth U19 coach at RB Leipzig, as the head coach. At the end of the season, Blessin won the Manager of the Year in Belgium. Representatives of clubs from across Europe watched Oostende and their coach closely and Blessin was targeted by Sheffield United.

In Lee's first year of ownership in the 2020–21 season, with a frugal policy but a clear vision, KV Oostende finished in 5th place and made it to the playoffs for the Europa League play-off group with one of the youngest squads and the smallest budget in the league. Lee's football group transformed KV Oostende from a relegation-threatened outfit before the acquisition, into one of the country's most successful football clubs in the 2020–2021 season.

AS Nancy Lorraine

After selling French football club OGC Nice to one of Britain's richest men, Jim Ratcliffe, in August 2019, Lee acquired French club AS Nancy on 31 December 2020 and became the chairman of board and co-owner. The club was founded in 1967 and has spent its entire history playing in either Ligue 1 or Ligue 2. Nancy's biggest achievement came in 1978 when the club won the Coupe de France, defeating Nice in the final. One of the club's most notable former players is Michel Platini, the former president of UEFA. Platini began his career at AS Nancy in 1972, and Arsène Wenger started his managerial career at Nancy in 1984.

Lee saw Nancy as appealing due to its historically strong performance, as well as its attractive location less than two hours’ train ride from Paris and the Nancy youth academy, the first youth academy of French football formed in the spring of 1964. With AS Nancy, Lee will continue to use the same strategies in his other clubs, using a data-based approach to identify talent and coaches, a focus on signing young players, and playing a high-pressing style of football. In Lee's first year of ownership in the 2020–21 season, AS Nancy made strides in Ligue 2, finishing in 8th place. In May 2021, AS Nancy appointed Lee's former Barnsley manager Daniel Stendel as head coach. He was sacked in late September 2021 after 10 match days, without any success.

The season 2021-22 was a disaster and AS Nancy Lorraine was relegated to the 3rd division for the first time in history, with only 23 points for the season. French newspapers reported that the owners' Moneyball-based strategy failed to work.

Esbjerg fB

In March 2021, Lee, together with Pacific Media Group, Partners Path Capital, and Krishen Sud acquired Esbjerg fB, a professional football club based in Esbjerg, Denmark, the 6th European football club Lee invested in. Lee was attracted to the club's impressive history, strong youth academy, and the passionate fans and sponsors. He intended to focus on talented young players using his proven data and analysis platform.

On 11 August 2021, after a bad start to the season, Hyballa resigned as manager of Esbjerg and was replaced by Roland Vrabec. He was dismissed in March 2022 after seven months, as the club was mathematically out of reach of promotion. Rafael van der Vaart was appointed caretaker coach. On 18 March, in a 3-0 home loss to Lyngby as the team was in a relegation battle, Esbjerg hooligans threw firecrackers onto the pitch and rioted after the game which resulted in multiple arrests. The club was finally relegated to the 2nd division in May 2022.

FC Den Bosch
In September 2021, Lee, together with Pacific Media Group, Partners Path Capital, Randy Frankel, and Krishen Sud acquired FC Den Bosch, a Dutch professional football club based 's-Hertogenbosch, Netherlands, Lee's 7th European football club investment.

1. FC Kaiserslautern

In March 2022, Lee became the co-owner of 1. FC Kaiserslautern, one of Germany's most legendary clubs, based in Kaiserslautern, Rhineland-Palatinate. Founded in 1900 as FC Palatia Kaiserslautern and as a founding member of the Bundesliga, the club won the German championship on four occasions and the German Cup twice. 1. FC Kaiserslautern is historically among the most successful football clubs in Germany, occupying 11th place in the all-time Bundesliga table. The club's international performances include reaching the Champions League quarter-finals in 1999 as well as two participations in the UEFA Cup semi-finals, Furthermore, Kaiserslautern's squad of the 1950s also formed the backbone of the Germany national team that won the 1954 World Cup, in what is called the Miracle of Bern (das Wunder von Bern) in Germany. The club, however, found itself in serious trouble in recent years, and was relegated to the second division for the second time in 2006. In 2018 the club was relegated to the third tier for the first time in club history. Lee pursued the investment in 1. FC Kaiserslautern as a long-term project in cooperation with club management, fans, and local partners to achieve a return to growth and success for the club.

On May 24, 2022, during Lee's first year of investment, FC Kaiserslautern earned promotion back to the 2. Bundesliga.

Hotel industry
Lee has invested significantly in the hospitality industry. In 2014 he invested in Asian Coast Development (Canada) Ltd., the developer of The Grand Ho Tram Strip in Vietnam, one of the region's largest integrated resorts to capture Vietnam's booming tourist markets. In a 2014 interview with Forbes, Lee described the Ho Tram Strip as a “hidden diamond,” and remarked that tourism is one of the most important driving forces for Vietnam's economic development. Investors in the Ho Tram Strip included Warburg Pincus and Harbinger Capital. The first phase of the Ho Tram Strip development includes The Grand Ho Tram Resort & Casino, a 5-star award-winning hotel and resort, international conference center, and heliport which opened in July 2013, as well as The Bluffs Ho Tram Strip, a Greg Norman designed links-style Championship golf course which opened in October 2014 and in 2015 was named the World's Best New Golf Course and is ranked #35 in The World by Golf Digest.

In 2005 Lee co-founded 7 Days Inn, one of the largest budget hotel chains in China, to focus on the growing Chinese domestic travel industry; Lee saw tourism and the emergence of a newly rich middle class fueling the travel boom, while China has become one of the world's most-watched tourist markets. In 2006, Warburg Pincus invested in 7 Days Inn. In 2007, Merrill Lynch, Deutsche Bank, and Warburg Pincus further invested in the hotel chain; in September 2009 7 Days Inn was listed on the New York Stock Exchange (NYSE: SVN). The hotel chain has grown from 5 hotels in 2 cities in 2005 to 283 hotels in 41 cities when it was listed on the NYSE. In July 2013 the founders of 7 Days Inn, together with Carlyle Group and Sequoia Capital took 7 Days Inn private to form holding company Plateno Hotels Group. By the end of 2014, 7 days Inn had 2,000 hotels in 320 cities. In 2015 Jinjiang Hotels bought 81% of 7 Days Inn. By the end of 2019, 7 Days Inn had 4,700 hotels in 450 cities.

Honours 
 2018-19 EFL League One Runners-up (as owner of Barnsley F.C.)

References

External links
 
 Chien Lee- Forbes
 / Chien Lee- Interview

Date of birth missing (living people)
Living people
20th-century American businesspeople
21st-century American businesspeople
American investors
American soccer chairmen and investors
Chinese football chairmen and investors
Chinese businesspeople
Sports businesspeople
English football chairmen and investors
Chairmen and investors of football clubs in France
Year of birth missing (living people)
American hoteliers
Hotel founders